Goal Navad Qa'em Shahr Football Club is an Iranian football club based in Qa'em Shahr, Iran. They currently compete in the 2010–11 Iran Football's 2nd Division.

Season-by-Season

The table below shows the achievements of the club in various competitions.

See also
 Hazfi Cup
 Iran Football's 2nd Division 2010–11

Football clubs in Iran
Association football clubs established in 2006
2006 establishments in Iran